Decree time refers to the changes introduced to the Soviet Union time system by a Sovnarkom decree of 16 June 1930. By this decree, all clocks in the Soviet Union were permanently shifted one hour ahead at 00:00 on 21 June 1930 everywhere in the Soviet Union. Applicability of this decree was further extended by two other decrees in 1930 and 1931. The practice was further extended, and its legal basis was amended, in 1980.

It is independent from daylight saving time, which was introduced in the USSR much later, in 1981. In fact, with both time shifts in effect, summer time was two hours ahead of standard time in the USSR.

From 1982 to 1986, decree time was gradually abolished by the Soviet government in 30 oblasts and autonomous republics of the Russian SFSR. In 1989,  it was further abolished in Estonia, Latvia, Lithuania, Ukraine and Moldavia, followed by the entire territory of the Soviet Union in March 1991 (nine months before its dissolution).

On 23 October 1991, the Supreme Soviet of the Russian SFSR ruled to restore decree time in Russia. It was restored on 19 January 1992 at 02:00, with the following exemptions:
the Kaliningrad Oblast was permitted to use Eastern European Time instead of Moscow Time;
all federal subjects that would have to use Samara Time in absence of this exemption (Adygea, most part of Arkhangelsk Oblast, Astrakhan Oblast, Chechnya, Chuvashia, Dagestan, Ingushetia, Ivanovo Oblast, Kabardino-Balkaria, Kalmykia, Karachay-Cherkessia, Kostroma Oblast, Kirov Oblast, Krasnodar Krai, Lipetsk Oblast, Mari El, Mordovia, Nizhny Novgorod Oblast, North Ossetia-Alania, Penza Oblast, Rostov Oblast, Ryazan Oblast, Samara Oblast, Saratov Oblast, Stavropol Krai, Tambov Oblast, Tatarstan, Udmurtia, Ulyanovsk Oblast, Vladimir Oblast, Volgograd Oblast, Vologda Oblast, Voronezh Oblast, Yaroslavl Oblast) were permitted to use Moscow Time instead;
the whole Arkhangelsk Oblast and Komi Republic were permitted to use Moscow Time;
the Tyumen Oblast was permitted to use Yekaterinburg Time instead of Omsk Time; and
the whole Krasnoyarsk Krai was permitted to use Krasnoyarsk Time (its easternmost parts would have to use Irkutsk Time otherwise).
Most of these exemptions are equivalent to abolition of decree time in corresponding territories. At present, all these federal subjects use the exemptions.

In 1992 decree time was restored in Armenia, Azerbaijan, Georgia, Kazakhstan, and the former Central Asia republics as well.

Notes

See also
Time in Russia

Time in Russia
Time
1930 in the Soviet Union